Boutancourt is a former commune in the Ardennes department and Grand Est region of north-eastern France. On 1 January 2019, it was merged into the commune Flize.

Population

See also

Communes of the Ardennes department

References

Former communes of Ardennes (department)
Ardennes communes articles needing translation from French Wikipedia
Populated places disestablished in 2019